Peter Butenschøn (born 20 April 1944) is a Norwegian architect and publicist. He was born in Oslo, the son of Barthold A. Butenschøn and Ragnhild Butenschøn. From 1973 to 1980 he lectured in city planning at the Oslo School of Architecture and Design. He has been co-editor of the Norwegian journal Byggekunst, and architecture critic for the newspaper Dagbladet. He worked for the Ministry of Culture and contributed to the Report to Parliament titled Kultur i tiden. He was the first leader of the foundation Norsk Form, and chaired the board of the Norwegian Museum of Cultural History  from 1989 to 1997.

References

1944 births
Living people
Academic staff of the Oslo School of Architecture and Design